The discography of the  Finnish symphonic metal band Nightwish consists of nine studio albums, one extended play, six live albums, seven compilations, eighteen music videos and twenty-two singles. The band was formed in 1996 by songwriter and keyboardist Tuomas Holopainen, guitarist Emppu Vuorinen, and former vocalist Tarja Turunen; Nightwish's current line-up has six members although Turunen has been replaced by Anette Olzon and later by Floor Jansen, and the original bassist, Sami Vänskä, has been replaced by Marko Hietala, who also took over the male vocalist part.

Although Nightwish has been popular in Finland since 1997 when they released their debut album, Angels Fall First, they did not achieve worldwide fame until the release of the albums Oceanborn, Wishmaster and Century Child, which were released in 1998, 2000 and 2002, respectively. The 2004 album, Once, had sold more than one million copies by the end of 2005 and allowed the band to host the Once Upon a Tour, concluded in Finland on 21 October 2005, when they played their last concert with Turunen on vocals and also when the End of an Era DVD was recorded. In May 2007, former Alyson Avenue frontwoman Anette Olzon was revealed as Turunen's replacement, and the album Dark Passion Play was released on September 26 after the singles "Eva" in May and "Amaranth" in August.

The next Nightwish single, "Storytime", was released on 9 November 2011, and the seventh studio album, Imaginaerum, was released on November 30 of the same year. It accompanied a movie of the same name, directed by Stobe Harju, who previously directed Nightwish's "The Islander" music video. The band started the Imaginaerum World Tour in the United States city of Los Angeles on 21 January 2012, at the Gibson Amphitheatre.

As of 2012, Nightwish has sold over 9 million records worldwide, including about 900,000 in Finland, over 1 million in Germany and over 500,000 in the U.S.

Albums

Studio albums

Live albums

Compilation albums

Soundtracks

Video albums

Demo albums

EPs

Singles

Promotional singles

Music videos

See also
Tarja Turunen discography
List of Nightwish band members

References

External links
Nightwish's official website

Discography
Heavy metal group discographies
Discographies of Finnish artists